John Olgus "Augie" Prudhomme (November 20, 1902 – October 4, 1992) was a pitcher in Major League Baseball. He played for the Detroit Tigers in 1929.

Career
Prudhomme was born in Frierson, Louisiana. He started his professional baseball career in 1926, with the New England League's Lawrence Merry Macks. That season, he went 19–11 with a 4.79 earned run average and led the league in wins and innings pitched. Prudhomme then played in the International League for a few seasons. In 1928, he went 19–15 with a 3.02 ERA, and this earned him a spot on the Detroit Tigers' roster.

1929 was Prudhomme's only season in the major leagues. He pitched in 34 games, including 6 starts, and went 1–6 with a 6.22 ERA. He returned to the minors in 1930 and his career petered out from there, as he never posted another ERA total under 4.50.

Prudhomme retired with 95 career minor league wins to go along with his lone major league victory. He died in 1992 in Shreveport, Louisiana.

References

External links

1902 births
1992 deaths
Major League Baseball pitchers
Detroit Tigers players
Rochester Tribe players
Lawrence Merry Macks players
Reading Keystones players
Toronto Maple Leafs (International League) players
St. Paul Saints (AA) players
Portland Beavers players
Baltimore Orioles (IL) players
Baseball players from Louisiana